The  or  is a causeway between Beauvoir-sur-Mer and the island of Noirmoutier, in Vendée on the Atlantic coast of France. A road runs along the causeway.

Every year, a foot race – the Foulées du Gois – is held across it, starting at the onset of high tide.

Tour de France
The Passage du Gois was used in Stage 2 of the 1999 Tour de France bicycle race. It proved to be decisive due to a crash caused by the slippery surface. The crash created a six-minute split in the peloton which ended the hopes of many favourites to win the race, including Alex Zülle, who would eventually finish second overall.

The Passage du Gois was used again in the 2011 race, as the starting point of the first stage.

See also
Île de Noirmoutier
The Broomway, a similar causeway to Foulness Island in Essex, England

References

Geography of Vendée
Causeways